Miklós Küzmics (Slovene: Mikloš Küzmič; September 15, 1737 – April 11, 1804) was a Hungarian Slovene writer and translator.

Biography
Küzmics was born in Dolnji Slaveči and died in Kančevci. His parents were János and Erzsébet Küsmics [sic]. He was trained as a school supervisor for the Slovene Catholic schools in Prekmurje. Miklós Küzmics wrote the first bilingual textbook for the Hungarian Slovenes, entitled ABC knizsica narodni soul haszek (Elementary School Primer), which he translated from German into Hungarian and Slovene. This booklet, which contained the first Slovene-Hungarian dictionary, appeared in Buda in 1790.

He also translated the four Gospels into Prekmurje Slovene. The book was printed in 1804 in Szombathely as Szvéti Evangyeliomi.

Although they had the same surname, Miklós Küzmics was not related to István Küzmics, the most important Protestant writer and educator of the Hungarian Slovenes in Prekmurje.

Works 
 Krátká Summa Velikoga Katekizmussa, Sopron 1780 (Small Tenet of the Great Catechism)
 Szvéti evangyeliomi, 1780 (Holy Gospels)
 Szlovenszki Silabikar, 1780 (Slovene Service Book)
 Pomoucs Beté'snih, Mirajoucsih, 1781
 Kniga Molitvena, na haszek Szlovénszkegá národá, 1783 (Prayer Book for the Slovene Nation)
 ABC Kni'sicza na narodni soul haszek, Büdin 1790 (The Alphabet Booklet in Favor of the Nationality Schools)
 Sztárogá i nouvogá Testamentumé svéte histórie Kratke Summa, Szombathely 1796 (Small Tenet of the Holy Histories of the Old and New Testament)

See also
 List of Slovene writers and poets in Hungary

References
 Mária Mukics (2003), "The Slovenians of Hungary", Changing World.

1737 births
1804 deaths
People from the Municipality of Grad
18th-century Slovenian Roman Catholic priests
Slovenian writers and poets in Hungary
Hungarian translators
Slovenian translators
18th-century translators